Scotinotylus formicarius is a species of sheet weaver found in the United States. It was described by Dondale & Redner in 1972.

References

Linyphiidae
Spiders of the United States
Spiders described in 1972